The CNO Financial Group Indianapolis Monumental Marathon and Monumental Half Marathon are a pair of concurrent road races run annually in downtown Indianapolis, Indiana, United States. The Monumental Marathon, first held in 2008, is a  road race. Since 2016, it has been the only full fall marathon run in Indianapolis. In 2015, it claimed to have become one of the 20 largest marathons in the United States.  "A beautiful place to set your pace" is the tagline of the Monumental Marathon.

History
The Monumental Marathon was established by Carlton Ray in 2008. Just over 1,100 runners completed the race's inaugural running, while almost 2,000 completed the race the following year. Nearly 3,000 runners completed the half marathon in 2009. Beginning in 2010, a 5k race was offered as well. In 2014, Runners World named the race as on of the nine best, new U.S. marathons.

In 2015, the Monumental Marathon purchased the Indianapolis Marathon and converted it into a half marathon, operating as the Indy Half Marathon at Fort Ben. Prior to the purchase, the Monumental Marathon was reported to be in the top 25 marathons in the United States.

In 2017, Jed Cornforth was appointed as executive director of the event, replacing the prior director, Blake Boldon, who left the event to direct the Drake Relays.

The 2020 in-person edition of the race was cancelled due to the coronavirus pandemic, with all registrants given the option of running the race virtually or transferring their entry to 2021. An e-mail address was provided for registrants to request a refund, without any additional details regarding a refund policy.

Course
The course for the Monumental Marathon begins and ends near the Indiana Statehouse in downtown Indianapolis. The Monumental Half Marathon is run concurrently with the full marathon. The two races follow identical routes for the first six or so miles, split, then re-converge for the last  of the course.

Attendance and winners

See also
 List of marathon races in North America
 List of attractions and events in Indianapolis

References

Marathons in the United States
Sports competitions in Indianapolis
Track and field in Indiana